Valentino Petrelli (August 6, 1922 – September 8, 2001 in Piacenza), better known as Tino, was an Italian photographer, well known for his documentary photography.

At the age of 12 he moved to Milan and in 1937 he started to work for Publifoto as an office boy, but at the age of 16 he started to work as photographer. He covered Italy under fascist rule, the war and reconstruction, as well as the economic boom in the 1960s and the social conflicts in the 1970s.

In 1948 he made a famous series of documentary photographs, showing the misery, exclusion and hunger of the people of Africo in the Aspromonte in Calabria. The series was published in the magazine L’Europeo, jointly with an article, entitled Africo, symbol of disparity, by the journalist Tommaso Besozzi. The pictures produced an outrage from national public opinion which, at the time, was rediscovering the dramatic situation of the "southern question".

In 1951, he documented the flooding of the Polesine, which compelled 150,000 people to evacuate the entire area between the lower courses of the Adige and the Po rivers.

References

External links
 Valentino Petrelli, collection of photos on LombardiaBeniCulturali.it
 Valentino Tino Petrelli: La nostra storia per immagini
 "W Fausto" scritto nella neve

1922 births
2001 deaths
People from the Province of Pordenone
Italian photographers
Italian photojournalists